ABC Kids may refer to:
 ABC Kids (Australia), a part-time digital TV channel for preschoolers from the Australian Broadcasting Corporation
 The brand name for the Australian Broadcasting Corporation's children's programming on ABC Television prior to 2009
 ABC Kids (TV programming block), a defunct youth's programming block on American Broadcasting Company in the United States, 1997 to 2011

See also
 ABC Kids World, a themed land at the Dreamworld amusement park on the Gold Coast, Queensland, Australia